Aenetus blackburnii (Blackburn's ghost moth) is a moth of the family Hepialidae. It is known from Australia, where it is widely distributed.

Adults have been recorded from March to April.

References

Moths described in 1892
Hepialidae